Carlos Joao Montoya García (born 4 May 2002) is a Peruvian footballer who plays as a defender for Alianza Lima.

Career statistics

Club

Notes

References

2002 births
Living people
Peruvian footballers
Peru youth international footballers
Association football defenders
Sporting Cristal footballers
Academia Deportiva Cantolao players
Club Alianza Lima footballers
Footballers from Lima